Ryan Jonathan Kelley (born August 31, 1986) is an American actor. He is known for his roles in Mean Creek, Prayers for Bobby, as Ben Tennyson in Ben 10: Alien Swarm, and as Deputy Jordan Parrish on Teen Wolf.

Early life 
Kelley was born and raised in a western suburb of Chicago, Glen Ellyn, Illinois. He is the fifth eldest of 15 siblings (9 brothers and 6 sisters), and was raised as a Lutheran.

When he was two, his mother took him and five of his siblings to Chicago to meet an agent since the neighbors next door did the same thing. Kelley started appearing in commercials and gained his first role in a movie when he was in first grade and became a member of SAG at the age of four. He would travel to Los Angeles annually for pilot season and stay at the Oakwood apartments. Due to his being in and out of class, he was homeschooled during his last two years of high school. When he turned 18, he moved to Los Angeles.

Career 
In 2002, he had a supporting role in Stolen Summer, which was a film made during Project Greenlight. He also played the role of Ryan James in two episodes of Smallville.

Kelley won an Independent Spirit Award for his performance in Mean Creek in 2004. Also in 2004 he played a lead role in the movie The Dust Factory. In 2006, Kelley appeared in the film Letters from Iwo Jima as a marine. He also played Roy, a great-nephew of Butch Cassidy, in Outlaw Trail: The Treasure of Butch Cassidy.

He played a leading role in the movie Prayers for Bobby alongside Sigourney Weaver, which premiered in January 2009 on Lifetime. The Contra Costa Times called Kelley's portrayal of Bobby Griffith a "stirring performance". In November, he played the role of Ben Tennyson in Ben 10: Alien Swarm. In January 2012, Kelley was in the TV movie Sexting in Suburbia, with Liz Vassey and Jenn Proske. In 2014 Kelley joined the cast of the MTV show Teen Wolf as Jordan Parrish, a young deputy whose supernatural nature sparked an ongoing media buzz as neither audience nor Kelley himself knows what sort of creature Parrish is but later found out that he is a Hellhound in the summer finale of season five.

In September 2021, it was announced that a reunion film for 2011 Teen Wolf television series had been ordered by Paramount+, with Jeff Davis returning as a screenwriter and executive producer for the film. The majority of the original cast members, including Kelley himself, will reprise their roles. The film was released on January 26, 2023.

Filmography

Film

Television

Web

Music videos

Awards and nominations

References

External links

 

1986 births
Living people
20th-century American male actors
21st-century American male actors
American male child actors
American male film actors
American male television actors
Male actors from Illinois
People from Glen Ellyn, Illinois